State Road 228 (NM 228) is a  state highway in the US state of New Mexico. NM 228's western terminus is at NM 478 and NM 192 in Mesquite, and the eastern terminus is at Frontage Road 1035 (FR 1035) east of Mesquite.

Major intersections

See also

References

228
Transportation in Doña Ana County, New Mexico